Emmett Davis (born September 9, 1959) is a former American college basketball player coach. He coached Division I for 26 seasons and is the winningest coach in the 115-year history of Colgate University, with 165 wins in his 13 seasons. Davis is currently managing the Mid-Atlantic Regional Accounts for Sports Technology Industry Leader, XOS Digital. Born in Gloversville, New York, he is a former player at St. Lawrence University. Davis spent 12 seasons as an assistant at the US Naval Academy from 1986 to 1998. He coached NBA All-Star and Hall of Famer David Robinson. He helped Navy head coach Don DeVoe to three NCAA tournament bids in his last four seasons at Navy. In 2011–12 he served as an assistant at the University of Tulsa in C-USA. On March 16, 2011, Davis was released from his contract as head coach of Colgate University. He was replaced by Matt Langel.

Head coaching record

References

External links
Colgate University Men's Basketball Head Coach

1959 births
Living people
Basketball coaches from New York (state)
Basketball players from New York (state)
Colgate Raiders men's basketball coaches
College men's basketball head coaches in the United States
Navy Midshipmen men's basketball coaches
People from Gloversville, New York
St. Lawrence Saints men's basketball players
Tulsa Golden Hurricane men's basketball coaches
American men's basketball coaches
American men's basketball players